Robert E. Rich Jr. (born January 25, 1941) is an American businessman, philanthropist and writer. He is currently chairman of the board and majority owner of Rich Products Corporation (Rich's), a large food processing company headquartered in Buffalo, New York.

Early life 
Robert E. Rich Jr. graduated from Williams College with a bachelor's degree in 1963 and Simon Business School in 1969 an MBA degree with honors.

Career
In 1964 he joined Rich Products, a company started by his father, as president of a start up subsidiary, Rich Products of Canada. Rich also served in the United States National Guard from 1963 to 1969 and was a member of the Army Reserve Officer school staff. He also earned an MBA (with honors) from Simon Business School at the University of Rochester in 1969. Moving to Rich's American headquarters that year, he created the company's first marketing department and took on the new role of Vice President of Sales and Marketing. In 1978 he was named President of Rich's.

When his father died in Palm Beach, Florida in 2006, Robert Jr., was elected to the position of chairman of the board of Rich Products.

Outside activities 
In 1969, Rich was an investor and member of the inaugural board of directors of the Buffalo Sabres of the National Hockey League and later became Vice Chairman of that professional hockey team.

In 1983 Rich Products Corp. purchased the Buffalo Bisons minor league baseball team. The Bisons are the AAA affiliate of the Toronto Blue Jays. Rich's also owns the Northwest Arkansas Naturals (the AA affiliate of the Kansas City Royals), and the West Virginia Black Bears, charter members of the Major League Baseball Draft League. Rich serves as chairman of those three baseball clubs and is also a member of the Trustees Council of the University of Rochester.

Rich has chaired many industry organizations including the National Frozen Food Association (NFFA), the Uniform Code Council (Bar Codes) the Grocery Manufacturers Association (GMA) and ENACTUS (formerly Students in Free Enterprise - SIFE).

Rich was elected to the board of directors of Cleveland Clinic in 2002 and chaired philanthropy and a fundraising campaign for the Clinic that raised more than $1.5 billion. He then served as Chairman of Cleveland Clinic for two four-year terms from 2011 to 2019. He remains involved with the Clinic today, serves as their Chairman Emeritus and assisted in their Centennial Campaign that has raised $2.5 billion.

Personal life
Rich is married and has four children. His wife, Mindy, is vice chairman of Rich Products and has been with the company for more than 37 years.

Rich has authored five books, the proceeds of which were donated to charities including the Cystic Fibrosis Foundation, Boys and Girls Clubs of Western New York, Project Healing Waters, and has co-written a sixth. His fifth book, a novel, titled “Looking Through Water”, is being produced as a movie and enters pre-production in 2022. Politically, Rich is an Independent.

References

Bibliography

1941 births
Living people
Williams College alumni
American businesspeople
Buffalo Bisons (minor league)